Paul Haydon Greene (born 9 December 1972) is a professional musician and was an Australian athlete who competed in the 1996 Olympics in the 400m and 4 x 400m relay. He also competed in the Commonwealth Games in 1990 and 1994, and the World Championships in 1991 and 1995

In 2000, he joined the Australian superband Ghostwriters with drummer Rob Hirst (Midnight Oil) and bassist Rick Grossman (ex-Hoodoo Gurus). 

In 2001 Greene released his first solo album The Miles which was well received, and led to the release of This Way, Happy Here With You, Reset, Distance Over Time and Everywhere Is Home. This release has seen him move into the role of producer and engineer. 

In 2012, under the name Paul Greene & The Other Colours, the self-recorded and produced Behind the Stars was released and was ARIA finalist for best Blues and Roots Album. One Lap Around the Sun was released in 2014 also self recorded and produced. Greene runs his own record Label and recording studio Red Shelf Records records.

Personal life
Greene has 3 children, Lily (born 2004) Matilda (born 2008) and Quincy (Born 2017). In 2018 he wrote a school song for Culburra Public School in 2018 and continues to write, produce and release music through Red Shelf Records. He now coaches Athletics.

Discography

Albums

References

External links

Living people
1972 births
Sportsmen from New South Wales
Athletes (track and field) at the 1990 Commonwealth Games
Athletes (track and field) at the 1994 Commonwealth Games
Athletes (track and field) at the 1996 Summer Olympics
Olympic athletes of Australia
Athletes from Sydney
Australian male sprinters
Commonwealth Games competitors for Australia